Goodenia elongata, commonly known as lanky goodenia,  is a species of flowering plant in the family Goodeniaceae and is endemic to south-eastern Australia. It is an erect or ascending herb with lance-shaped stem leaves, and yellow flowers arranged singly or in racemes.

Description

Taxonomy and naming
Goodenia elongata was first formally described in 1805 by Jacques Labillardière in Novae Hollandiae Plantarum Specimen.

Distribution and habitat
This goodenia grows in forest, usually in wet places and is found in New South Wales south from Holbrook, in the eastern half of Victoria and in many lowland areas of Tasmania. There are a few records from eastern Victoria and a single record from the far south-east of South Australia.

References

elongata
Flora of New South Wales
Flora of Victoria (Australia)
Flora of Tasmania
Flora of South Australia
Plants described in 1805
Taxa named by Jacques Labillardière
Endemic flora of Australia